Valtteri Parikka (born December 8, 1994) is a Finnish ice hockey defenceman. His is currently playing with KalPa in the Finnish Liiga.

Parikka made his Liiga debut playing with Ässät during the 2013–14 Liiga season.

References

External links

1994 births
Living people
Ässät players
Finnish ice hockey defencemen
Hokki players
Iisalmen Peli-Karhut players
KalPa players
KeuPa HT players
Kiekko-Vantaa players
Lahti Pelicans players
Peliitat Heinola players
People from Järvenpää